The Suchan Valley Campaign was the clearing and occupation of the mining region around the Russian town of Suchan (currently Partizansk, Russia) in a climatically-unforgiving region of Russia's Siberia during the Russian Civil War. A relatively clean sweep, the operation inflicted heavy casualties on the Bolsheviks.

Battle
With the failed Russian surprise assault against a numerically-inferior American force during the Battle of Romanovka in June, the Suchan Mines were entirely cut off from Vladivostok. Soviet control of these mines prevented the Americans from fulfilling specified duties in the region, so a three-pronged offensive was launched to clear the valley of armed opposition.

Five companies of the 31st Infantry, U.S. Army, took on the responsibility of clearing the Suchan, while every stretch of captured territory within the valley was handed over to garrison guard forces manned by the U.S. Marines and Navy.

References

1919 in Russia
Battles of the Russian Civil War involving the United States
20th-century military history of the United States
Battles of the Russian Civil War
July 1919 events
August 1919 events